Anime Current was an anime television block running on G4 Canada, in which one series is broadcast from beginning to end. It was similar to Anime Unleashed, a former programming block on the American version of G4. It premiered on 6 November 2006  with R.O.D the TV. 

On 1 January 2007, G4techTV and Geneon Entertainment announced an exclusive deal in which Geneon titles would air on Anime Current. Previously, Geneon's first (and only) title that aired in Canada was Samurai Champloo on Razer's Kamikaze block. 

On 25 June 2007, the channel announced the lineup would include six series, first being, Serial Experiments Lain, Texhnolyze, Last Exile, Tokyo Underground, Ergo Proxy, and Paranoia Agent. At the end of July 2008, Anime Current reappeared on the channel's schedule, but would finally shut down a few months later in November 2008.

Series broadcast earlier
(In Order of date aired)
R.O.D the TV
Gad Guard
Tenjho Tenge
Gun Sword
Trigun
Lupin the Third Part II (First 52 episodes only)
Serial Experiments Lain
Paranoia Agent
Texhnolyze
Last Exile
Tokyo Underground
Ergo Proxy
Requiem from the Darkness
3×3 Eyes
Black Lagoon

Series that never aired 
Daphne in the Brilliant Blue - Advertised as set to air once Lupin The 3rd Part II's 52 episode run concluded, the series never made it to air, most likely due to Geneon shutting down their North American operations.

References 

Television programming blocks in Canada
Anime television